The A Three Rivers District is a high school conference of the Virginia High School League located in Southwest Virginia.

History
The district was originally named for the New River, Roanoke River, and Little River and was focused on the New River Valley.  In 2017, the VHSL shuffled many districts, including the Three Rivers, because of demographic changes.  In an effort to have schools of similar size competing in the same districts, smaller members were removed from the conference as Auburn and Giles High Schools moved to the A Mountain Empire District and Eastern Montgomery shifted to the A Pioneer District.  These schools were replaced when Pioneer District powerhouse James River joined and Alleghany and Carroll County moved down from the larger Blue Ridge and River Ridge Districts, respectively.  These moves changed the rivers cited in the name as the addition of Alleghany and James River High Schools brought the Cowpasture, Jackson, and James Rivers into the conversation as well.

In late 2020, it was announced that Alleghany County Public Schools and Covington City Public Schools would merge due to declining attendance.  The new school system will be known as Alleghany Highlands Public Schools and the two high schools will merge to create a new Alleghany High School that will take on Covington's Cougar nickname.

Geographic Makeup
The Three Rivers District is located in Southwest Virginia and takes its name from the rivers mentioned above.  It draws its members from the Roanoke Valley, the New River Valley and the Alleghany Highlands.  The district currently includes members from Alleghany County, Botetourt County, Carroll County, Floyd County, Roanoke County, and Radford City.

Regional and State Competition
While the VHSL uses District formatting for regular season contests and determining postseason eligibility, the teams are divided into different classes and regions for Regional and State-level competitions.  As such, Three Rivers District members compete in the following formats (as of 2022):
Class 3, Region D (Carroll County)
Class 2, Region C (Alleghany, Floyd County, Glenvar, James River, Radford)

Member schools
Alleghany High School Mountaineers of Covington
Carroll County High School Cavaliers of Hillsville
Floyd County High School Buffaloes of Floyd
Glenvar High School Highlanders of Salem
James River High School Knights of Springwood
Radford High School Bobcats of Radford

Future Member
Alleghany High School Cougars of Covington

Former Members
Auburn High School Eagles of Riner
Eastern Montgomery High School Mustangs of Elliston
Giles High School Spartans of Pearisburg

References

Virginia High School League